Walpurgis Rites – Hexenwahn is the eighth studio album by the Austrian blackened death metal band Belphegor.  It was released in 2009 on Nuclear Blast Records (their third for the label).

Like its predecessors, Pestapokalypse VI and Bondage Goat Zombie, the album was recorded and produced with German producer Andy Classen. On 25 August the band made the song "Walpurgis Rites" available for streaming on their Myspace page along with the lyrics on their website. As of 1 October the video for 'Der Geisterstreiber' is now available.

Track listing

Personnel

Charts

Release history

References

Belphegor albums
2009 albums
Nuclear Blast albums
German-language albums
Albums produced by Andy Classen